José Esteban Coronado or Villa Coronado is a town and seat of the municipality of Coronado, in the northern Mexican state of Chihuahua. As of 2010, the town had a population of 1,121, up from 976 as of 2005.

References

Populated places in Chihuahua (state)